The Patriotic Front  (PF) is a Bulgarian nationalist coalition participating in the November 2021 Bulgarian parliamentary election. The coalition includes NFSB, Entire Bulgaria and BDSR. At the same time, the coalition does not include VMRO and Volya, which was in several coalitions before this one: Patriotic Front (2014), United Patriots, and Bulgarian Patriots.

Electoral history

Parliamentary

Presidential

See also
Patriotic Front (2014-2017)
United Patriots (2016-2021)
Bulgarian Patriots (May–August 2021)

References

2021 establishments in Bulgaria
Conservative parties in Bulgaria
Eurosceptic parties in Bulgaria
National conservative parties
Nationalist parties in Bulgaria
Political parties established in 2021
Political party alliances in Bulgaria
Right-wing populism in Bulgaria
Right-wing populist parties
Social conservative parties